Lok Satta  is a classical liberal political party in India, founded by Nagabhairava Jaya Prakash Narayana, a former I.A.S. officer and renowned activist from Andhra Pradesh. Since 1996, the Lok Satta Movement functioned as a non-governmental organisation, but on 2 October 2006, the movement was reorganised into a formal political party. The party intends to further the causes of the Lok Satta Movement, including a reduction in the size of the cabinet, promotion of the Right to Information Act, and disclosure of criminal records and assets by political candidates. Beginning with the 2009 elections the party has adopted a whistle as their official symbol. On 23 March 2016, the party founder president, Jayaprakash Narayan said that they will not take part in electoral politics for sometime.

History

Lok Satta started as a citizen movement, Lok Satta Andolana or Lok Satta Movement, in Andhra Pradesh and later spread across the country, including Mumbai, with the Vote JUHU and Vote Mumbai campaigns. It also played a major role in the Jaago Re! One Billion Votes. The Lok Satta organisation worked on bringing about several political reforms by working with other civic organisations. Lok Satta Party was founded with the realisation that entering into politics is the only option to bring about fundamental changes in the system and a new political culture. It grew rapidly, amassing over 30,000 members in the Greater Hyderabad region and over 60,000 members in Andhra Pradesh before it became a political party.

Lok Satta Party is now active in few other Indian states, including Karnataka and Maharashtra. It was also active earlier in Tamil Nadu and Delhi.

Leadership
The party's founder and National President is Jayaprakash Narayan, a former doctor who was an IAS officer in the 1980s from Andhra Pradesh. Narayan resigned from the IAS in 1996 to found the Lok Satta Movement, and the political party in 2006.

National Steering Committee

National Steering Committee is the highest body of Lok Satta Party. It is a subset of the National Council of the party.

Notable past members of the National Steering Committee include Katari Srinivasa Rao, D.V.V.S. Varma and Dr. Ashwin Mahesh.

Ideology
The political goals of Lok Satta include political, economic, and social equality for all people, making citizens the centre of governance, and to reform the government to make it less corrupt and more accessible and responsible to the people.

Symbols
The Party flag also serves as the Party logo. The dark blue colour symbolises the vastness, depth and inclusive nature of the ocean. The white colour of the circle stands for purity. The colour symbolises unity of purpose and action. The five-pointed blue star signifies the party's course and the five corners of the star stand for what the party argues are the five pillars of a true democracy:

 Liberty
 Self-governance
 Citizen empowerment
 Rule of law
 Self-correcting institutions.

References

External links
Official website
Lok Satta News
NRI wing of Lok Satta Party

 
Political parties established in 2006
2006 establishments in Andhra Pradesh
Political parties in Andhra Pradesh
Conservative parties in India